Wheeling University (WU, formerly Wheeling Jesuit University) is a private Roman Catholic university in Wheeling, West Virginia. It was founded as Wheeling College in 1954 by the Society of Jesus (also known as the Jesuits) and was a Jesuit institution until 2019. Wheeling University competes in Division II of the National Collegiate Athletic Association as a member of the Mountain East Conference.

History
Richard Whelan, bishop of the Diocese of Wheeling, lobbied the Society of Jesus in the 19th century to establish a university in the growing city.  Over a century later, Whelan's original vision came to fruition.  After a donor, Sara Tracy, left her estate to the diocese, it purchased land for a Jesuit college from Mt. De Chantal Visitation Academy.

Wheeling College was founded through a partnership of the Diocese of Wheeling-Charleston with the Maryland Province of the Society of Jesus. Ground was broken on November 24, 1953, and the college was officially incorporated on September 25, 1954. It opened to students on September 26, 1955. The establishment of the college required $2.75 million in start-up costs. Overcoming the difficulties of temporary facilities and a faculty of twelve Jesuit priests and four lay professors, the school grew considerably.

For the 1987–1988 school year, the university became Wheeling Jesuit College, and in July 1996, gained university status.

In 2012, university leadership was accused by the federal government of misappropriating NASA grant money received for sponsored programs. Wheeling Jesuit settled with the federal government in 2015, paying $2.3 million in restitution.

In March 2013, the university announced the selection of Fr. James Fleming as its tenth president.  Fleming took office effective July 1, 2013. Fleming resigned from the presidency on January 3, 2017.

In 2019, the school eliminated majors in history, theology, philosophy, literature and engineering, and cut 20 of the university's full-time faculty members.

In March 2021, the Higher Learning Commission placed the university on probation after it failed to meet several accreditation criteria.

Jesuit heritage
Prior to 2019, the Jesuit community was active in the process of education at Wheeling. In addition, the Jesuits were involved in many other academic works, such as the Appalachian Institute on campus. Members of Wheeling's Jesuit Community reside at Whelan Hall, dedicated in 1955. The Jesuit community and tradition for critical thinking were reflected in the school's curriculum and mission. Wheeling Jesuit University was a member of the Association of Jesuit Colleges and Universities.

In April 2019, as part of a broader restructuring of its academic programs, the university announced the elimination of its programs in theology and philosophy that are key to its identity as a Jesuit institution. The Jesuits in turn decided to end their academic affiliation with the university at the end of the 2018–2019 academic year, while continuing to provide "an ongoing Jesuit presence" through its campus ministry and other programs. Two months later, Monsignor Kevin Quirk resigned from his position as chair of the university's board of trustees after The Washington Post published details from a confidential report alleging that one of his former colleagues was guilty of sexual abuse and financial impropriety. In July, the university formally dropped "Jesuit" from its name and became Wheeling University.

Presidents
Very Rev. Lawrence R. McHugh, S.J.,  1954–1959
Rev. William F. Troy, S.J., 1959–1966
Rev. Frank R. Haig, S.J., 1966–1972
Rev. Charles L. Currie Jr., S.J., 1972–1982
Rev. Thomas S. Acker, S.J., 1982–2000
Rev. George F. Lundy, S.J., 2000–2003
Rev. Joseph R. Hacala, S.J., 2003–2006
James F. Birge, Ph.D. (interim), 2006–2007
Rev. Julio Giulietti, S.J., 2007–2009
J. Davitt McAteer (acting), 2009–2010
Sr. Francis Marie Thrailkill (interim), 2010
Richard A. Beyer, 2011–2013
Rev. James J. Fleming, S.J., 2013–2017
Debra M. Townsley, Ph.D., 2017–2018
Mark Phillips, interim, summer 2018
Michael P. Mihalyo, Jr., D.M.A., 2018–2019
Ginny R. Favede, 2019–present

Admissions and rankings
According to the Wheeling University's page on the U-CAN Network, the average high school GPA of the freshman class is 3.5 The school is given a selectivity score of 81 out of 100 by the Princeton Review. In 1997, WJU was named as the fourth-best educational value in the southeast, and the 15th-best college in the region. In addition, the school is ranked as the 18th best master's university in the South by U.S. News & World Report.  The 2009 Forbes magazine ranking placed WJU as 180 of 600 colleges, a marked improvement from their No. 437 rank in 2008. Forbes ranked the university as the 79th best value in America.  The university is ranked among the John Templeton Foundation's Colleges that Encourage Character Development.

Academics

In honor of former professor Fr. Stephen J. Laut, S.J., the university offers the Laut Honors Program.  Throughout each school year, members of the program meet to discuss and study material related to that year's theme.  At the conclusion of a student's sophomore year, students who have successfully completed the Laut program are invited to join the Ignatian Honors Seminar, a more rigorous program for which only six juniors and six seniors are selected.

Wheeling encourages all students to become actively involved in research in their desired fields. In many fields, seniors are required to complete a thesis or capstone project.  In addition, students are actively encouraged to participate in the annual Student Research and Scholarship Symposium, in which students present research done over the past academic year.

Graduate programs
Wheeling University's Center for Professional and Graduate Studies offers five graduate programs, a Master of Business Administration; Master of Accountancy; Master of Science in Nursing; Master of Science in Organizational Leadership; and a Doctor of Physical Therapy.

The Center for Professional and Graduate Studies offers a Bachelor of Arts in Organizational Leadership and Development (BOLD) and a Master of Science in Organizational Leadership (MSOL). These are adult education programs that meet once a week in the evening.

Clifford M. Lewis, S.J. Appalachian Institute
Founded in September 2002, The Appalachian Institute is a pastoral and academic response of Wheeling University to the Appalachian bishops’ pastoral letters, This Land is Home to Me (1975 - on power and powerlessness in Appalachia) and At Home in the Web of Life (1995 - on sustainability). Focused on advocacy, culture, education, research and service through the mode of immersion, as matters of social justice, the Appalachian Institute grounds its mission as a responsible and sustainable partner for the university and the Diocese of Wheeling-Charleston invigorating the Catholic social mission as an available instrument of Catholic social teaching, and as a positive force for growing sustainable relationships with community partners locally, nationwide & internationally. The Appalachian Institute at Wheeling University has focused on issues such as Appalachian health, hope, education, economic and energy development, and issues related to coal impoundment, conducting research and producing exhibits regarding these issues.

In 2010, the university hosted the Ignatian Solidarity Network Spring Teach-In, which focused on issues of environmental sustainability and stewardship.  In September 2010, the Appalachian Institute held its second annual Appalachian Film Festival.

Institute for the Study of Capitalism and Morality
As a result of a donation from BB&T, in 2006 the university became home to the Institute for the Study of Capitalism and Morality. According to its website, the Institute desires to study the roles of capitalism in a free society. The institute also promotes research and essay competitions, forums and debates, and a lecture series. Lecturers for the 2007–2008 school year included Thomas Woods and Doug Bandow.  In 2011, the ISCM welcomed former BB&T CEO John A. Allison IV to campus.

Academic facilities

Acker Science Center
Named for the school's former president Rev. Fr. Thomas S. Acker, S.J., the Acker Science Center was built in 2002. It is home to classrooms and labs.

Donahue Hall
The oldest academic building on campus, Donahue Hall was constructed in 1955 and was renovated in 1988. Donahue holds faculty offices, labs, and classrooms. The hall is connected to the Acker Science Center via the "Acker bridge."

Mount de Chantal Conservatory of Music
The adjacent former girl's academy, Mount de Chantal Visitation Academy ceased operations in August 2010 and the Sisters of the Visitation who ran the school since its inception moved to the monastery at Georgetown Visitation Academy in Washington, DC. Wishing to see the Mount's legacy continued, the sisters gifted a large sum of money to establish and fund a Conservatory of Music at the university.

Thus the Mount de Chantal Conservatory of Music came to be in the lower floor of the university's CET building. The Conservatory features a recital hall, practice rooms, a parlor for students and visitors, and a gallery displaying art, antiques and archival materials from Mount de Chantal Visitation Academy. Each year, one incoming female freshman receives a $10,000 Mount de Chantal Scholarship, renewable annually, through the Mount de Chantal Fine Arts Education Fund.

In the Fall of 2013, Wheeling University expanded its physical therapy doctoral program into downtown Wheeling, WV where it offers a free physical therapy clinic. The physical therapy program will relocate back to campus starting in the Fall 2019 semester.

Athletics

The Wheeling athletic teams are called the Cardinals. The university is a member of the Division II level of the National Collegiate Athletic Association (NCAA), primarily competing in the Mountain East Conference (MEC) as a founding member since the 2013–14 academic year. The Cardinals previously competed in the defunct West Virginia Intercollegiate Athletic Conference (WVIAC) from 1957–58 to 2012–13.

Wheeling competes in 19 intercollegiate varsity sports: Men's sports include baseball, basketball, cross country, football, golf, lacrosse, D1A rugby, soccer, swimming, track & field and wrestling; while women's sports include basketball, cross country, golf, soccer, softball, swimming, track & field and volleyball. Former sports included women's lacrosse.

Facilities
The university's home indoor athletic events for volleyball and basketball are held in WJU's McDonough Center. WU's football, soccer, and women's lacrosse teams play on the turfed Bishop Schmitt Field. The Cardinals baseball and softball teams call the J.B. Chambers Complex located off campus located along I-470 as their home fields.

Campus life
Wheeling University's campus features fifteen buildings, six of which are residence halls.

Residence life

The university has seven residence halls under its jurisdiction.

 Campion – Housing for male freshman and upperclassmen students with 1 floor for female students
 McHugh – Housing for male freshman students
 Ignatius – Upgraded co-ed housing for upperclass students, featuring an "Ace Floor" for approved, academically achieved students with around-the-clock quiet hours
 Kirby – Upgraded housing for female students, occasionally freshmen
 Sara Tracy – Housing for female freshman students
 Steenrod – Apartment housing for graduate students, off the main campus but on university-owned property across Washington Avenue.

Student organizations and publications

Student government
The Student Government Association offices are located in Swint Hall.  The Student Government Association is the elected voice of WU students.  The Wheeling SGA consists of two branches: the executive board ("E-Board") and the Student Senate.  The E-Board consists of a President and Vice President, Secretary, Treasurer, Student Advocate, Social Affairs Representative, Academic Affairs Representative, and Academic Affairs Representative.  The Student Senate is composed of at-large representatives, class officers, and a commuter representative.

Organizations
Wheeling University students are given an array of opportunities for campus involvement. Student Government and the Campus Activities Board plan activities each year, in addition to those already put on by clubs. While many of the clubs are service-oriented in nature, there are also political, artistic, and major-related organizations.

Appalachian Experience Club
Campus Activities Board
Criminal Justice Club
HESS (Help Enrich Someone Special) Mentoring
International Student Club
Philosophy Club (Sense and Nonsense)
Student Leaders Across Campus
Student Nurses Association
Theatre Guild

Campus traditions

Culture Fest
Each spring Wheeling's International Student club sponsors a festival celebrating the cultural diversity of WU. The activities included samples of ethnic food as well as music and demonstrations from students' native countries.

Last Blast
"Last Blast" is held at the end of every school year.  The events include a concert, a formal dance, a carnival held outside of Donahue Hall, and a raft race down Wheeling Creek. Some of the artists at past Last Blast concerts include Andy Grammer and Punchline.

Jesuit Idol
Jesuit Idol is an annual talent competition modeled after American Idol and held every spring semester.  Contestants sing before a live audience and a panel of judges, and are eliminated in a series of themed rounds.  The winner is awarded a cash prize.  The event is streamed online.

People

Notable alumni

 John Beilein, (1975), former head coach, Cleveland Cavaliers men's basketball team
 Lionel Cartwright, (1982), country musician
 John N. Ellem, former member, West Virginia House of Delegates
 John Gage (labor leader), (1968), president of the American Federation of Government Employees, member of the AFL–CIO executive committee
 Neil Holloway, head coach, Ocean City Nor'easters
 Richard Joltes, (1983), computational linguistics instructor at Harvard University
 John M. Maris, M.D., (1983), chief of Division of Oncology and Director of the Center for Childhood Cancer Research at the Children's Hospital of Philadelphia
 Anthony F. Migliaccio, Jr., risk management and security expert, director of security for the 2004 Summer Olympics
 Michael Mulligan (businessman), former MapQuest CEO
 Remy Munasifi, comedian and musical artist
 Tim Murphy, (1974), U.S. representative for Pennsylvania's 18th District
 Jeanne Neff, former president, The Sage Colleges
 John F. Noonan, former president, Bloomfield College
 George Novacky, (1968), assistant department chair and senior lecturer in computer science, University of Pittsburgh.
 John G. Panagiotou, (1990), Greek Orthodox theologian
Kathleen Hawk Sawyer (1972), director, Federal Bureau of Prisons, 1992–2003
 Erikka Lynn Storch, (1996), member, West Virginia House of Delegates
 Jason H. Wilson, (MBA), Ohio state senator
 James T Smith, (1964), Baltimore County, Maryland, county executive
 Tara Wilson, 2000, Miss West Virginia USA
 JT Woodruff (attended, did not graduate), lead singer of Hawthorne Heights
 John B. Yasinsky, (1961), former OMNOVA Solutions CEO
 Ricky Yahn, (2007), assistant coach, Cornell Big Red men's basketball team
 Christina Richey, (2004), cross-divisional program officer, NASA Headquarters; deputy program scientist, OSIRIS-REx spacecraft mission
 Remy Munasifi, (2002), stand-up comedian, parody musician, and video artist best known as GoRemy
 Haywood Highsmith, (2018), professional basketball player, currently playing for the Miami Heat

Notable faculty and staff 
J. Donald Freeze, S.J., former philosophy professor and academic vice president of Georgetown University
Msgr. Alfred Jolson, S.J., former business professor and Bishop of Reykjavík
Jim O'Brien, former head basketball coach, former Indiana Pacers coach
Judson Shaver, former religious studies professor, current president of Marymount Manhattan College
Fr. Michael F. Steltenkamp, S.J., professor of theology, author, Nicholas Black Elk: Medicine Man, Missionary, Mystic, Black Elk: Holy Man of the Oglala, and The Sacred Vision: Native American Religion and Its Practice Today.
Edward W. Younkins, professor of accountancy and business administration, author

Sponsored programs

Challenger Learning Center
The Challenger Learning Center at WU is one of 43 such centers worldwide. It offers several educational programs to middle and high school students. One of the more notable is a Space Shuttle simulation.

See also
 List of Jesuit sites

References

External links
 Official website
 Official athletics website

 
Education in Ohio County, West Virginia
Jesuit universities and colleges in the United States
Educational institutions established in 1954
Association of Catholic Colleges and Universities
Wheeling, West Virginia
Buildings and structures in Wheeling, West Virginia
Tourist attractions in Ohio County, West Virginia
1954 establishments in West Virginia
Catholic universities and colleges in West Virginia
Roman Catholic Diocese of Wheeling-Charleston